

Television

1990s

1980s

1970s

Radio

1990s

1980s

1970s

Notes
1 André Lacroix replaced Larry Pleau as color commentator during the 1980-1981 season when Pleau, who was also an assistant coach, became head coach of the Whalers.

References 

 
SportsChannel
Hartford Whalers
broadcasters
World Hockey Association broadcasters